The Blow Up (1967–1972) was a famous nightclub in Munich and Germany's first large-scale discotheque. During its existence, the nightclub was the favorite topic of magazines and daily newspapers because of countless happenings, drug stories and its psychedelic light projections.  The British Pathé described the club as being "the hottest and most expensive happening center in West Germany. It's wild, it's way-out, it's with it, it's got everything."

History and Description 
The nightclub was founded in 1967 by the Samy brothers in a former cinema that had been erected in 1926 in Munich's Schwabing district and named after Michelangelo Antonioni's 1966 film Blow Up. The brothers Temur and  Anusch Samy (called "The kings of the flower power era in Schwabing"), who were of Iranian descent and the first concept- and event gastronomers in Germany, founded a business empire including several nightclubs, pubs, restaurants, underground bars, a brewery, a shopping center called Citta 2000 and a cab company, and were described by contemporary witnesses and business partners as trendsetters who established a whole new kind of gastronomy trade in Munich that changed all of the city. Blow Up, their masterpiece, had multiple levels and platforms on which the bands could play and the go-go girls dance, as well as gangways from which the guests could reach the different levels and watch the main dancefloor, which was "bombarded" by the flashes of 250 stage lights and light projectors. One of the innovations was that the stage lights reacted to the rhythm of the music, which marked the beginning of synchronized light shows in discotheques. The Samy brothers invested 850,000 German marks just for the installations of the club.

Already the opening party, which was covered broadly by the media, made the Blow Up a national sensation. Up to 5,000 people tried to squeeze into the building, and only 1,600 tickets had been sold until the pressure of the throng could no longer to be withstood and the crowd stormed the building. 3,500 people made it in, thousand more than officially allowed. In this general turmoil, men in smoking overthrew the box office and pinched a stack of receipts, a prominent PR consultant got his glasses beaten out of his face, and a young man took possession of the microphone, praised Rudi Dutschke and accused the Federal Republic of Germany of economic exploitation. Others pulled down the iron railings or painted professions of sympathy for the Viet Cong onto the walls. These actions were partly tolerated, as the club owner Anusch Samy regarded the place as an "action center", which included "the participance of the audience" and that things that were knocked over or painted by the crowd should not be restored. The premiere event featured the London soul band Robert Hirst and The Big Taste the DJ Dave Lee Travis of Radio Caroline, the Gerhard-Wilson go-go girls from Paris, psychedelic light projections and a wild "paint-in", where participants threw pounds of paint at each other. In the meantime, hundreds of cars of visitors around the nightclub were fined for parking illegally. The legendary first night in the Blow Up ended with a tear gas attack which drove the crowd to a hasty departure.

In the following years the nightclub was the favorite topic of magazines and daily newspapers because of countless way-out happenings such as paint-ins, wet pool parties on the dancefloor, film screenings or "multimedia discos", the drug stories around the nightclub, its psychedelic light projections, as well as the high-profile artist bookings.  Artists who performed at the Blow Up include world stars such as Jimi Hendrix (who gave his first live performances in Germany at the Blow Up), Pink Floyd, Yes, Sammy Davis Jr., Bill Haley, Amon Düül, Julie Driscoll Tippetts or Brian Auger. The nightclub also was in the headlines because of further highlights such as the visit of novelist Günter Grass, who gave readings between go-go girls, visits by the communards Fritz Teufel, Uschi Obermaier and Rainer Langhans,  the later RAF terrorist Andreas Baader, and by other celebs such as actress Uschi Glas, Peter Kraus, Gunter Sachs or Prince Johannes of Thurn and Taxis.

In 1970, club owner Anusch Samy died in a pane crash close to St. Moritz. Following his dead, his brother Temur did not manage to keep the party empire together, and "Munich's biggest beat sensation" had to close in 1972. A supermarket chain planned to move into the building, which could be prevented by a civic movement. Eventually the city of Munich bought the building, which since 1993 houses a theater called Schauburg.

Quotes

Literature 
Mirko Hecktor, Moritz von Uslar, Patti Smith, Andreas Neumeister: Mjunik Disco – from 1949 to now (in German). Blumenbar Verlag, München 2008, .

External links

 The British Pathé on Blow Up  (YouTube)

References

Nightclubs in Munich
Buildings and structures in Munich
Music venues in Munich
Culture in Munich